Opera Cameos is a TV series which aired on the DuMont Television Network from November 8, 1953, to January 9, 1955. The program aired Sundays at 7:30pm ET, and was hosted by opera singer Giovanni Martinelli.  A conductor on the program was Salvatore Dell'Isola.

Episodes status
The Paley Center for Media has eight episodes, with the remaining episodes presumed lost.

See also
List of programs broadcast by the DuMont Television Network
List of surviving DuMont Television Network broadcasts
1954-55 United States network television schedule

Bibliography
Barnes, Scott "Vintage Portraits", Opera News, November, 2007. Accessed via subscription 27 October 2008.
Tim Brooks and Earle Marsh, The Complete Directory to Prime Time Network TV Shows, Third edition (New York: Ballantine Books, 1964) 
Alex McNeil, Total Television, fourth edition (New York: Penguin Books, 1980) 
David Weinstein, The Forgotten Network: DuMont and the Birth of American Television (Philadelphia: Temple University Press, 2004)

External links

DuMont historical website

DuMont Television Network original programming
Black-and-white American television shows
1953 American television series debuts
1955 American television series endings
Works about opera